L'allieva (The Pupil) is an album by Italian singer Mina, released in 2005.

The albums pays homage to the songs of Frank Sinatra, by whom Mina has been greatly influenced.

The first 11 songs are accompanied by a small combo of jazz musicians, ending appropriately with "My Way", while the last 3 recordings are a sort of added bonus tracks, with orchestral strings arrangements by Gianni Ferrio.

Track listing 
"These Foolish Things (Remind Me of You)" – 5:32 
"The Nearness of You" – 3:28
"Once I Loved (O Amor em Paz)" – 6:17 
"One for My Baby (and One More for the Road)" – 4:40 
"Angel Eyes" – 6:20 
"Blue Moon" – 6:19 
"Strangers in the Night" – 4:04 
"All the Way" – 4:42 
"Goodbye" – 2:55 
"Dindi" – 4:53
"My Way" – 2:39
"Only the Lonely" – 4:32 
"April in Paris" – 2:41 
"Laura" – 3:41

Certifications and sales

References

2005 albums
Mina (Italian singer) albums
Frank Sinatra tribute albums